Nalina Chitrakar is pop singer from Nepal. She was named the country's best pop singer in 1999 and 2005 and has performed at several events including Miss Nepal and Nepal Idol. She writes songs about the harmony between Madhesi and Pahadi people, and fights against the discrimination of the Madhesi communities of Nepal.

Early life and education 
She was born in the day of Indra Jatra as the youngest child in her family. She wanted to be an air-hostess in her childhood but it was never realized. She was a student of Psychology in Padma Kanya Multiple Campus where she was a batch-mate to Princess Shruti Shah. She got a scholarship to Chandigarh University for music study, but she did not join.

TV career 
In her early career, she worked for Channel Nepal as a tv host and also acted in commercials for oils and banks. She also took interview of Dipendra Shah.

Music career
Chitrakar started her singing after her SLC for Ganesh Yuwa Club in Rastriya Sabha Griha, Kathmandu; it was a Newari song. She also worked in Radio Nepal. The first Nepali song was Timro Adhar. Her second songs kina-kina, was a rock flavoured pop song, that was a new trend in Nepali society.

Award Nomination
Hits FM Music Awards for the song Kina-Kina
Hits FM Music Awards for the song Pani-pani

Albums
Creation
Nalina
Priyatam
Selected Nalina
Jindagi
Refresh, 2008
Parelima, 2012
Sahasle

Personal life 
She married Sanjeev Mishra in 2003. They have a son and live in California as of 2020.

References

21st-century Nepalese women singers
Living people
Year of birth missing (living people)
Nepalese playback singers
Padma Kanya Multiple Campus alumni